The White Hall Foundry is a historic iron foundry located at 102 S. Jacksonville St. in White Hall, Illinois. The foundry was built in 1877 for brothers George W. and Richard B. Winn. It produced cast iron for new buildings in White Hall, making it an important part of the city's economy during a building boom in the late 19th century. The building is a small brick structure with particularly well-crafted details for an industrial building, such as its cornice and fanlights. The internal truss system supporting the building's roof is an example of an inverted Kingpost truss; it is one of the few well-preserved examples of such a truss in Illinois.

The foundry was added to the National Register of Historic Places on May 28, 1980. It is also part of the White Hall Historic District, which is also listed on the National Register.

References

Industrial buildings and structures on the National Register of Historic Places in Illinois
Industrial buildings completed in 1877
Buildings and structures in Greene County, Illinois
National Register of Historic Places in Greene County, Illinois
1877 establishments in Illinois